The Mark Messier Leadership Award is a National Hockey League (NHL) award that recognizes an individual as a superior leader within their sport, and as a contributing member of society. The award is given to a player selected by Hockey Hall of Fame center Mark Messier to honor an individual who leads by positive example through on-ice performance, motivation of team members and a dedication to community activities and charitable causes. It was first awarded during 2006–07 NHL season and sponsored by Cold-fX.

History
In its first season, the Mark Messier Leadership Award was awarded quite differently from most other trophies in the NHL. In , five players were honored with monthly awards as selected by the NHL based on the qualification of potential recipients, while the final decision was made by Mark Messier. At the end of the regular season, one player is chosen as the Leader of the Year. The first winner of the annual award was Chris Chelios of the Detroit Red Wings.

The award's namesake, Mark Messier, played in the NHL for twenty-five seasons with the Edmonton Oilers, New York Rangers, and Vancouver Canucks; his 1,887 regular-season points are third all-time behind Jaromir Jagr and Wayne Gretzky, and his 1,756 regular-season games third to Patrick Marleau and Gordie Howe (he is first in games played, including playoffs).

Winners

2006–07 Monthly Award

2007–Present

Notes
1. Crosby previously won the monthly award in January 2007.

See also
List of National Hockey League awards

References
General
Mark Messier NHL Leadership Award at NHL.com

Specific

Messier